Koran Sindo (lit. Sindo Paper) is an Indonesian newspaper published by Media Nusantara Citra (MNC Media) under PT Media Nusantara Informasi. The term "Sindo" is taken from the abbreviation of Seputar Indonesia, the former flagship news program on RCTI that later evolved into Seputar iNews. The paper is known for infographics shown on its front page.

Koran Sindo is part of Sindo Media, a single-brand subsidiary of MNC Media which includes weekly news magazine Sindo Weekly and news portal Sindonews.com, as well as (formerly) television network Sindo TV (currently iNews) and radio network Sindo Trijaya FM (currently MNC Trijaya FM).

History
The newspaper was first published on June 30, 2005 as Harian Seputar Indonesia. Since September 2006, Koran Sindo began to published in local edition in several provinces, which includes both national and local news. Presently the local edition exists in 9 provinces, including West Java, North Sumatra, Riau Islands, and South Sulawesi. In 2019 the paper underwent logo and layout changes.

In 2013, Harian Seputar Indonesia was renamed Koran Sindo as a part of rebranding several news-related assets of MNC Media into single-brand Sindo Media.

As of 2020, the official website of Koran Sindo is redirected into Sindonews.com news portal.

Awarding
Koran Sindo has been initiated some awards, such as People of the Year (given to individuals) and Rekor Bisnis (Business Records, given to companies).

See also
 Seputar Indonesia
 RCTI
 iNews
 MNC Trijaya FM

References

External links
  SINDONews.com news portal
  Official website (redirects into SINDONews.com article index posted by Koran Sindo)

Newspapers published in Jakarta
2005 establishments in Indonesia
Publications established in 2005
Media Nusantara Citra